,  born  in Okayama Prefecture was a Japanese painter.

Biography
Takeshiro Kanokogi studied with painters Matsubata Sangoro and later Koyama Shōtarō in  Tokyo. He traveled  back and forth to Paris France several times, at first when he was 26 years old. He spent around seven years in the city, during which time he studied with Jean-Paul Laurens and Émile-René Ménard at the Académie Julian.

He is known  for portrait, figure, land and seascape painting  in the Western style.

Images

Collections
 Hiroshima Museum of Art
 Kurashiki City Art Museum
 Musée d'Orsay

Bibliography 
La vie et l’œuvre de Takeshiro Kanokogui: peintre japonais, by Matsutarô Tokumi; translation by Masakiyo Miyamoto and Louis Marchand, Institut Franco-Japonais de Kyôto.

References

External links
 Recent exhibits

1874 births
1941 deaths
People from Okayama Prefecture
Académie Julian alumni
Japanese portrait painters
20th-century Japanese painters
Artists from Okayama Prefecture